The 1985 winners of the Torneo di Viareggio (in English, the Viareggio Tournament, officially the Viareggio Cup World Football Tournament Coppa Carnevale), the annual youth football tournament held in Viareggio, Tuscany, are listed below.

Format
The 16 teams are seeded in 4 groups. Each team from a group meets the others in a single tie. The winner of each group progress to the final knockout stage.

Participating teams
Italian teams

  Atalanta
  Fiorentina
  Genoa
  Inter Milan
  Milan
  Napoli
  Roma
  Sampdoria
  Torino

European teams

  Nottingham Forest
  Aberdeen
  Ajax
  Universitatea Craiova
  Sarajevo
  Rijeka
  Spartak Moskva

Group stage

Group A

Group B

Group C

Group D

Knockout stage

Champions

Footnotes

External links
 Official Site (Italian)
 Results on RSSSF.com

1983
1984–85 in Italian football
1984–85 in Yugoslav football
1984–85 in English football
1984–85 in Scottish football
1984–85 in Romanian football
1984–85 in Dutch football
1985 in Soviet football